The Notwist  are a German indie rock band. Formed in 1989, the band moved through several musical incarnations, despite maintaining a relatively stable line-up.  While their early records moved through heavy metal into dark indie rock, their recent efforts for which they have received the most attention have been strongly influenced by the electronica scene, along with the other groups on the record label, Morr Music.

History 
The Acher brothers and Messerschmid formed the group in 1989, in Weilheim in Oberbayern, near Munich. In 1990, they recorded their self-titled debut, a grunge-metal oriented LP. 1992 saw the release of Nook, which has an indie rock sound, while their 1995 album 12, contains their first flirtation with electronics.  Martin Gretschmann then joined the group in 1997. Shrink, released in 1998, is a jazz-electro-rock album. In 1998, Cynthia Dall did the vocals for a remix of "Torture Day" by The Notwist. The album Neon Golden (released in 2002) put them on the map for American listeners, with its heartfelt sentiment and more pop-oriented sound.

Messerschmidt left the group in 2007, and was replaced by Andi Haberl. The band's sixth album, The Devil, You + Me, was released in Europe in May 2008. On June 17, 2008 the album was released in North America on Domino Records.

In 2009, the Notwist recorded Storm, the soundtrack to the film of the same name by director Hans-Christian Schmid. In late 2012 they began playing songs from a new album on tour. The album, Close to the Glass, was released on February 24, 2014 under Sub Pop Records.

In 2014, Martin Gretschmann left the group.

In January 2015, Close to the Glass was nominated for IMPALA's European Independent Album of the Year Award.

Collaborations and side projects
The group has been remixed by Four Tet, Caribou, Grizzly Bear, Console, Loopspool, Panda Bear and others. Singer Markus Acher also collaborated with Anticon and rapper/producer Alias on the song, "Unseen Sights". In 1991, Markus Acher made a noise, post rock band, Village of Savoonga, in Weilheim, Germany. They released Village Of Savoonga (1992), Philipp Schatz (1996) and Score (1997).

The Notwist formed a group with Themselves named 13 & God, whose eponymous debut was released in 2005. Markus Acher, in addition to his work with The Notwist and 13 & God, also worked with the band Lali Puna until his departure in 2017, while Mecki Messerschmidt now also plays drums for the reformed Schweisser. Micha Acher composes and programs for Ms. John Soda.

Members

Current
 Markus Acher — guitars, vocals, keyboards, turntables (1989–present)
 Micha Acher — bass, keyboards (1989–present)
 Andi Haberl — drums (2007–present)
 Max Punktezahl of Saroos — guitar, keyboards (present)
 Karl Ivar Refseth — vibraphone, percussion (present)
 Cico Beck of Joasihno — guitar, keyboards, percussion, electronics (present)

Former
 Martin Gretschmann (aka Console and Acid Pauli) — programming, keyboards (1997–2014)
 Martin Messerschmid — drums (1989–2007)

Discography

Studio Albums 
 The Notwist (1991)
 Nook (1992)
 12 (1995)
 Shrink (1998)
 Neon Golden (2002)
 The Devil, You + Me (2008)
 Sturm (soundtrack, 2009)
 Close to the Glass (2014)
 The Messier Objects (2015)
 Vertigo Days (2021)

Live Album 
 Superheroes, Ghostvillains + Stuff (2016)

Singles and EPs 
 Johnny and Mary EP (1994)
 Only in America EP (1996)
 Untitled (Selections From 12) EP (1997)
 "Day 7" single (1997)
 "Chemicals" single (1998)
 "Trashing Days" single (2001)
 "Pilot" single (2001)
 "Pick Up the Phone" single (2002)
 "One With the Freaks" single (2002)
 Untitled (Scoop) EP (2002)
 Lichter EP (2003) (Soundtrack for the film Distant Lights (Lichter))
 Different Cars and Trains EP (2003)
 Solo Swim EP (2004)
 "Where in this World" single (2008)
 "Boneless" single (2008)
 "Come In" single (2009)
 "Blank Air" single (2010)
 "Kong" single (2014)

References

External links
 
 

German electronic music groups
German experimental musical groups
German indie rock groups
Musical groups established in 1989
Morr Music artists
Sub Pop artists
City Slang artists